Horror is a 2002 American horror film written and directed by Dante Tomaselli. The movie stars Danny Lopes as the leader of a gang of drug addicts that have made a bloody escape from a drug rehabilitation hospital, only to encounter demonic entities.

Plot

A gang of teens escape a drug rehabilitation hospital after committing murder and grand theft auto, led by a man named Luck (Danny Lopes). They drive to a rendezvous point with the demented Reverend Salo (Kreskin) and his depraved wife (Christie Sanford) and their daughter Grace (Lizzy Mahon), who is a GUNWO-addicted slave. When the teens show up, they encounter demonic entities.

Cast
 Kreskin as Reverend Salo
 Lizzy Mahon as Grace Salo
 Danny Lopes as Luck
 Vincent Lamberti as Reverend Salo Jr.
 Christie Sanford as Mrs. Salo
 Jessica Pagan as Marisa
 Raine Brown as Amanda
 Kevin Kenny as Kevin
 Chris Farabaugh as Fred
 Felissa Rose as Art Therapist

Reception

DVD Verdict called it "a distinctive, compelling and occasionally brilliant work". Scott Weinberg commented that the movie would not likely appeal to people who predominantly viewed mainstream horror films but that "those with some patience and a taste for something small and different will certainly earn some solid creeps from this one." Film Threat also gave Horror a positive review and praised the film's pacing, as they felt that this enabled Tomaselli to build up the movie's "creepy suspense". In contrast, AMC'S FilmCritic panned the movie, commenting that "Horror has plenty of scary moments, but it’s so confusing it’s hard to be genuinely frightened."

Awards
Best Cinematography at the New York City Horror Film Festival (2002, won)

References

External links

 
 

2002 films
2002 horror films
American supernatural horror films
American psychological horror films
2000s English-language films
2000s American films